Vecindario is a town in the municipality of Santa Lucía de Tirajana in the south-eastern part of the island of Gran Canaria, in the Province of Las Palmas, in the Canary Islands. The population of Vecindario was estimated at about 14910 inhabitants in the 2015 census. Its current mayor is Dunia Gonzalez.

Vecindario is located in the coastal area of the municipality of Santa Lucia de Tirajana being the 3rd in population of the island and the 5th of the archipelago. Its population centres are Vecindario, El Doctoral, San Pedro Mártir, La Paredilla, La Cerruda, Hoya Pavón, San Rafael, El Canario, Casa Pastores, La Unión, Cruce de Sardina, Sardina, La Vereda, Los Llanos and Balos. Vecindario has an estimated population of almost 70,000 inhabitants. It is located about 35 km from Las Palmas de Gran Canaria, the capital of the island, 15 km from the airport of Gran Canaria and another 15 km from Maspalomas, the main tourist area of the island.

Vecindario is the nerve centre of the south-eastern conurbation of Gran Canaria, consisting mainly of the coastal neighbourhoods of the municipalities of Santa Lucía de Tirajana, Agüimes and Ingenio, which are all on the island of Gran Canaria. Other towns in this conurbation, which has around 120,000 inhabitants, are Cruce de Arinaga, Playa de Arinaga (Agüimes) and Carrizal (Ingenio).

Agriculture was the main economic activity of Vecindario until the last quarter of the twentieth century for the production of tomatoes and other vegetables for export, when the service sector (especially trade) became predominant. At present, Vecindario is the largest urban open-air shopping centre on the island of Gran Canaria, together with the C.C. Atlántico and others of lesser importance such as C.C. Mercacentro, C.C. La Ciel and C.C. Avenida.

History 

Vecindario was born as a result of the Agüimes mutiny, a consequence of the lawsuit between the residents of Agüimes and the Count of the Vega Grande over the ownership of the lands of the Llanos that they had plundered clandestinely. The Count claimed his property, alleging that he had bought it from its rightful owner. The neighbors of Agüimes, which belonged at that time to the Bishopric, were defended by Dr. Mendoza, a canon expert in law. It is precisely in this lawsuit that the name Vecindario ("the neighborhood's land") is used for the first time, in reference to the neighbors of Agüimes.

Dr. Mendoza demonstrated the falsity of the sale to the Count of the lands, which were of real ownership and had been granted to the neighbors in property by the payment of the pertinent taxes. Still in 1735, the neighbors had not paid Doctoral Mendoza for his defense in the lawsuit, so they proceeded to segregate a part of the lands of Vecindario as payment: it is in this area, later known as El Doctoral, where the house of La Pinta was built. Mendoza stipulated that a part of what was produced on a plot of land segregated for this purpose would be destined to the aid of the Holy House of Jerusalem, taking this place from then on the name of the Holy House.

In 1815 the coastal area (today's Vecindario and Sardina, until then part of Agüimes) and inland lands belonging to San Bartolomé de Tirajana were united to create the new municipality of Santa Lucía de Tirajana.

See also
List of municipalities in Las Palmas

References

External links

 Vecindario website

Populated places in Gran Canaria